The following is a list of terms used in bird topography:

Plumage features

 Back
 Belly
 Breast
 Cheek
 Chin
 Crest
 Crown
 Crown patch
 Ear-coverts
 Eye-ring
 Eyestripe (or eye line)
 Feather, see category: :Category:Feathers
 Flanks
 Forecrown
 Gorget
 Hood (or half-hood)
 Lateral throat stripe
 Lores
 Malar
 Mantle
 Mask
 Moustachial stripe
 Nape
 Nuchal collar
 Operculum (on pigeons).
 Pennaceous feathers
 Postocular stripe
 Remiges
 Rump
 Spectacles
 Submoustachial stripe
 Supercilium
 Supraloral
 Parts of the tail include:
Rectrices
 Tail corner
 Terminal band
Subterminal band
 Throat
 Undertail coverts
 Upper mandible (or maxilla)
 Uppertail coverts
 Vent, crissum or cloaca
 Vent band
Parts of the wings include:
 Alula
 Apical spot
 Axillar
 Bend of wing
 Carpal covert
 Emargination
 Greater coverts
 Leading edge of wing
 Lesser coverts
 Marginal coverts
 Median coverts
 Mirror (on gulls)
 Primaries
 Primary projection
 Primary numbers (e.g. 1, 2, 3, etc.)
 Scapulars
 Scapular crescent (on gulls)
 Secondaries
 Speculum
 Tertials
 Tertial step (on gulls)
 Trailing edge of wing
 Upper scapulars
 Wing bar
 Wing coverts
 Wing edging
 Wing linings
 Wing tip or point (denoted by the number of the longest primary, counted from the carpal joint)

Bare-parts features
 Beak or bill
 Cere
 Culmen
 Gape
 Gonys
 Gonydeal angle
 Gonydeal spot
Nail (of beak)
Nares
 Rhamphotheca
 Gnathotheca
 Rhinotheca
Tomia
 Brooding patch
 Caruncle (bird anatomy)
 Comb, or Coxcomb
 Orbital skin, or orbital ring
 Tarsus
 Tibia
 Wattle

See also
 Glossary of bird terms

References